Progressive discipline is a system of discipline where the penalties increase upon repeat occurrences. 

This term is often used in an employment or human resources context where rather than terminating employees for first or minor infractions, there is a system of escalating responses intended to correct the negative behavior rather than to punish the employee.

In an employment context, the concept of just cause is usually at the root of progressive discipline practices.  Just cause is a principle in collective bargaining contracts that forces employers to prove their grievances against employees.

History

Progressive discipline evolved out of labor disputes and collective bargaining practices.  Prior to the widespread implementation of 'Just Cause' clauses in union contracts, it was not uncommon to see onerous hidden requirements of employment for workers. Among the most famous is Ford's insistence on investigating the personal lives of his employees and issuing terminations for those whose personal life he deemed unseemly.

Process

The typical stages of progressive discipline in a workplace are:
 Counseling or a verbal warning;
 A written warning;
 Suspension or demotion; and 
 Termination.

The stage chosen for a particular infraction will depend on a variety of factors that include the severity of the infraction, the previous work history of the employee and how the choice will affect others in the organization.

Also inherent in progressive discipline is regression to previous stages once enough time passes.

See also 

 Disciplinary probation

References

Human resource management